The Magnolia Blossom is an 1888 oil painting on canvas by Martin Johnson Heade. It depicts a magnolia flower laid upon a red cloth in a table.

References

1888 paintings
Paintings by Martin Johnson Heade
Paintings in the collection of the Timken Museum of Art